Crataegus anamesa, the Fort Bend hawthorn, is a species of hawthorn that is endemic to Texas, in North America.

References

anamesa
Endemic flora of Texas
Trees of the South-Central United States
Flora without expected TNC conservation status